The Uinta Indian Irrigation Project is the principal Indian irrigation project in the Uintah Basin. The United States Bureau of Indian Affairs designed and constructed this project. Today, it continues to serve Indian and non-Indian irrigators in the drainage of the Lake Fork River and elsewhere in the Basin. It continues to be owned by the Bureau of Indian Affairs, which has responsibility for its operation; however, operation has been turned over to a quasi-private operation and maintenance company organized in accordance with provisions of the Central Utah Project Completion Act.

See also
Moon Lake (Utah)
Uintah and Ouray Indian Reservation
Ute Indian Rights Settlement

References
 

Irrigation projects
Irrigation in the United States
Native American history of Utah